Magnus von Behm (27 March 1727, in Livonia – 9 July 1806) was the chief commander of Kamchatka in Russia from 1773 to 1779. His wife was Eva von Borning. They had four children; Maria, Eva, Peter and Charlotte Christina.

1727 births
1806 deaths
People from the Governorate of Livonia
Baltic-German people
18th-century military personnel from the Russian Empire